The Oaths Act 1978 (c 19) is an Act of the Parliament of the United Kingdom.

Part I of the Act applies to England, Wales and Northern Ireland.

Section 1 provides that an oath may be administered by the person taking the oath holding the New Testament, or, in the case of a Jew, the Old Testament, in his uplifted hand, and saying or repeating after the officer administering the oath the words "I swear by Almighty God that ...", followed by the words of the oath prescribed by law. In the case of a person who is neither a Christian nor a Jew, the oath shall be administered in any lawful manner.

Part II of the Act applies to the whole of the United Kingdom.

Section 3 provides that if any person to whom an oath is administered desires to swear with uplifted hand, in the form and manner in which an oath is usually administered in Scotland, he shall be permitted so to do, and the oath shall be administered to him in such form and manner without further question.

Section 4(2) provides that lack of religious belief does not affect the validity of an oath.

Section 5 provides for the making of a solemn affirmation by a person who objects to being sworn. A solemn affirmation may also be used where it is not reasonably practicable to administer an oath in a manner appropriate to a person's religious beliefs.

Section 6 provides that the form of a solemn affirmation is "I, do solemnly, sincerely and truly declare and affirm ..." followed by the words of the oath prescribed by law, omitting any words of imprecation or calling to witness.

Section 7 repealed the Oaths Act 1838, the Oaths Act 1888, the Oaths Act 1909, the Oaths Act 1961 and section 8 of the Administration of Justice Act 1977.

External links
Hansard, Introduction of the Oaths Bill, 23 March 1978
Hansard, Second Reading of the Oaths Bill, 11 April 1978
Hansard, Royal Assent to Oaths Bill, 30 June 1978

References

United Kingdom Acts of Parliament 1978
Oaths of allegiance